The University of Santa Monica is a private unaccredited graduate school in Santa Monica, California, offering masters of arts in spiritual psychology.

History

The university was founded in March 1976 by Roger Delano Hinkins, an educator, author and lecturer who is also known as John-Roger and founder of the Movement of Spiritual Inner Awareness (MSIA). He was joined in 1980 by Dr. H. Ronald Hulnick and Dr. Mary R. Hulnick (former faculty members at New Mexico State University), who shortly thereafter took on the roles and responsibilities as President and Academic Vice President, respectively. 
In September 1981 the first master’s students were admitted.

The institution lacks educational accreditation. The use of unaccredited degree titles is legally restricted or illegal in some jurisdictions.

However, in January 1982, the university received state government authorization to grant degrees in the state of California, which was maintained in subsequent years under the California Bureau for Private Postsecondary and Vocational Education (BPPVE). In 2010 USM received similar authorization from the California Bureau for Private Postsecondary Education, the agency that replaced the BPPVE 
In July 1992 the university received BPPVE approval to offer a master’s program in Counseling Psychology with an emphasis in Spiritual Psychology, which fulfills the educational requirements for licensing as a Marriage and Family Therapist in the state of California.

The university’s status of “Institutional Approval” is the highest status an institution can achieve under the California Private Postsecondary Education Act; but is not the same as educational accreditation.

Staff
Staff members as of 1995:
Ron Hulnick, president
Mary Hulnick, vice president

Degrees offered 
The following degrees are offered by the University of Santa Monica.
 M.A. in Spiritual Psychology
 M.A. in Spiritual Psychology with an emphasis in Consciousness, Health, and Healing

Courses consist of monthly on-site classes held at the university campus in Santa Monica over a two-year period for nine months of each year, plus a five-day intensive experiential practicum.  The weekend, monthly format allows students to travel to the university from other cities and countries.  In 2008 there were approximately 500 students enrolled.

In 2006, the university was approved by the aforementioned BPPVE to grant doctoral degrees in Spiritual Psychology, but shortly thereafter the State of California terminated the BPPVE altogether.  The university subsequently abandoned that degree program without ever enrolling any students.

Campus 
The university campus is located in Santa Monica, California approximately 15 miles west of downtown Los Angeles.  The campus' interior design, by the architecture firm of M. Charles Bernstein Architects, received an honor design award from the Los Angeles chapter of the American Institute of Architects in 1998.

Workshops
Ronald Hulnick is the founder of USM’s Freedom to Choose Prison Project, a service project conducted by USM graduates at Valley State Prison for Women in Chowchilla, California. The USM Prison Project is the original Freedom to Choose workshop and is supported by USM faculty and a group of volunteers.  The name of the workshop, “Freedom to Choose,” is derived from the work of Viktor Frankl, who was a psychologist interned in a concentration camp during World War II. Founded in 2004 by Ron Hulnick, it is co-facilitated by Drs. David and Bonnie Paul. In 2005, the USM Prison Project was nominated for a national award recognizing excellence in prison reform programs.

This service project inspired the documentary film Freedom to Choose.  The USM documentary highlights the story of the Freedom to Choose Workshop that was provided to over 160 inmates at Valley State Prison for Women in March 2007.  Forty-six volunteer graduates from USM’s M.A. Program in Spiritual Psychology traveled to this maximum-security women’s prison. The Freedom to Choose documentary won the 2009 Emerging Filmmaker Showcase in the Documentary Category at the American Pavilion at the Cannes Film Festival.

Awards and Acknowledgments for the film Freedom to Choose:
Winner - Documentary category, American Pavilion Emerging Filmmaker Showcase at Cannes 2009, May 16, 2009  Cannes Film Festival
2009 Honolulu International Film Awards, Aloha Accolade Award for Excellence in Filmmaking, March 13–15, 2009 
2009 White Sands Film Festival, Las Cruces, New Mexico, April 23–26, 2009

See also
 Unaccredited institutions of higher learning

References

External links 
 

Unaccredited institutions of higher learning in California
Movement of Spiritual Inner Awareness
Organizations based in Santa Monica, California
Educational institutions established in 1976
University of Santa Monica
1976 establishments in California
University of Santa Monica